AD 69 (LXIX) was a common year starting on Sunday (link will display the full calendar) of the Julian calendar. At the time, it was known as the Year of the Consulship of Augustus and Rufinus (or, less frequently, year 822 Ab urbe condita). The denomination AD 69 for this year has been used since the early medieval period, when the Anno Domini calendar era became the prevalent method in Europe for naming years.

Events

By place

Roman Empire 
 The Year of the Four Emperors: After Nero's death, Galba, Otho, Vitellius and Vespasian succeed each other as emperor during the year. The year is marked by numerous instances of a breakdown in discipline and mutinous conduct amongst the Roman legions and the praetorian guard.
 January 1 – The Roman legions in Germania Superior refuse to swear loyalty to Galba. They rebel and proclaim Vitellius as emperor.
 January 10 – Lucius Calpurnius Piso Licinianus is adopted by Galba and appointed to deputy Roman Emperor.
 January 15 – Galba and his adopted son Piso are murdered by the Praetorian Guard on the Roman Forum.
 Otho seizes power in Rome, proclaims himself emperor, and reigns for three months before committing suicide.
 Marcus Trebellius Maximus, governor of Britannia, is forced to flee to Gaul after a mutiny of Legio XX Valeria Victrix at Deva Victrix (Chester).
 April 14 – First Battle of Bedriacum: Vitellius defeats Otho's legions; Otho commits suicide.
 April 17 – After the First Battle of Bedriacum, Vitellius becomes emperor.
 Marcus Vettius Bolanus becomes the new governor of Britain and faces a second insurrection of Venutius, king of the Brigantes.
 July 1 – Tiberius Julius Alexander orders his legions in Alexandria to swear allegiance to Vespasian as emperor.
 July 3 – The army of Judea to swears allegiance to Vespasian as emperor.
 August 1 – Batavian rebellion: The Batavians in Germania Inferior (Netherlands) revolt under the leadership of Gaius Julius Civilis.
 German warbands cross over to join the revolt and attack the fortress at Mainz.
 The Batavians attack Roman forts on the Rhine frontier; Fectio and Traiectum (modern Utrecht) are destroyed.
 In Gallia Belgica, cohors II Tungrorum, raised from the inhabitants of Atuatuca Tungrorum in the north-west of the Ardennes Forest, revolt against the Romans.
 The Danubian legions of Raetia and Moesia proclaim Vespasian as emperor.
 October 24 – Second Battle of Bedriacum: Flavians under Antonius Primus defeat the Vitellians.
 December 22 – Vitellius is captured and murdered by the Gemonian stairs. Vespasian becomes emperor.
 Judea: The Jewish Revolt – Vespasian lays siege to Jerusalem; the city is captured the following year by his son Titus.
 Josephus, Jewish rebel leader, is dragged before Vespasian and becomes his historian (he "prophesied" him his elevation to the purple).
 Legio I Macriana liberatrix is disbanded.
 The Flavian dynasty starts.
</onlyinclude>

Births 
 Gaius Suetonius Tranquillus, Roman historian (approximate date)
 Polycarpus, bishop and martyr of Smyrna (d. AD 155)

Deaths 
 January 15
 Cornelius Laco, Roman praetorian prefect (murdered)
Sempronius Densus, Roman bodyguard (killed)
 Lucius Calpurnius Piso Licinianus, Roman deputy emperor (b. AD 38)
Servius Sulpicius Galba, Roman emperor (b. 3 BC)
 April 16 – Marcus Salvius Otho, Roman emperor (b. AD 32)
 December 20 – Titus Flavius Sabinus, Roman consul (murdered)
 December 22 – Aulus Vitellius Germanicus, Roman emperor (b. AD 15)
 Cartimandua, Queen of the Brigantes (approximate date)
 Gaius Ofonius Tigellinus, Roman praetorian prefect (suicide)
 Locusta, Roman female poison expert to Nero (executed)
 Lucius Vitellius (the Younger), Roman politician (executed)
 Marcus Hordeonius Flaccus, Roman politician (murdered)
 Sextilia, mother of Aulus Vitellius and Lucius Vitellius (suicide)
 Sporus, Roman freedman and male lover of Nero (suicide)
 Titus Vinius, Roman general and consul (b. AD 12)

References 

0069